The Estonia national under-21 football team represents Estonia in international under-21 football competitions and is controlled by the Estonian Football Association (Eesti Jalgpalli Liit), the governing body for football in Estonia.

The team's home ground is the Lilleküla Stadium in Tallinn, and the current manager is Roman Kozhukhovskyi. Estonia have never qualified for the UEFA European Under-21 Championship. They compete in the biennial Under-21 Baltic Cup and have won the tournament in 2014.

Coaching staff

Players

Current squad
 The following players were called-up for the 2022 Under-21 Baltic Cup matches.
 Match dates: 16 and 18 November 2022
 Opposition:  and 
Caps and goals correct as of: 8 June 2022, after the match against

Recent call-ups
The following players have also been called up to the squad within the last twelve months.

 INJ Withdrew due to an injury.
 PRE Preliminary squad.
 RET Retired from the national team.

Previous squads
Commonwealth Cup squads
2013 CIS Cup squad
2014 CIS Cup squad
2015 CIS Cup squad
2016 CIS Cup squad

Results and fixtures

Recent results within the last 12 months and upcoming fixtures.

Competitive record

UEFA European Under-21 Championship

Draws include knockout matches decided on penalty kicks.

Honours and achievements
Under-21 Baltic Cup
Winners (1): 2014

See also
Estonia national football team
Estonia national under-23 football team
Estonia national under-19 football team
Estonia national youth football team

References

External links
 

under-21
European national under-21 association football teams